Hovenia is a small genus of deciduous trees or shrubs in the family Rhamnaceae. They occur naturally from India to Japan. The Japanese, or Oriental raisin tree, Hovenia dulcis, is the best known species, as it is often planted in gardens outside Asia.

Fossil record
A fossil wood with features similar to those of the Oligocene Hovenia palaeodulcis from Japan is described from the late Eocene Florissant Fossil Beds National Monument, Colorado, United States. This is the first report of fossil wood of this Asian genus in North America.

Selected species

 Hovenia acerba
 syn Hovenia kiukiangensis
 Hovenia dulcis Thunb.
 syn Hovenia inaequalis DC.
 Hovenia parviflora
 Hovenia pubescens
 Hovenia robusta
 Hovenia tomentella
 Hovenia trichocarpa

References

Rhamnaceae
Rhamnaceae genera